An official appearance of the flag of Moravia, unlike the provincial Moravian coat of arms, does not exist, because such a flag has never been granted to Moravia. However, there are several documented variants of Moravian flags used in the past. The first recorded version dates from the mid-13th century.

The oldest history
There is a description of a Moravian flag in the chronicle of Ottokar aus der Gaal (also known as Otacher ouz der Geul or Ottokar von Steiermark; born about 1265, died between 1318 and 1322): Die Steirische Reimchronik.

The history of the Moravian flag is very varied and begins in the 13th century in the context of the relations between Bohemia and Moravia organized within the construction of a centralized monarchy by the last kings of the Přemyslid dynasty. The colouring of the flag (or banner) was according to vexillological rules derived from the colours of heraldic coats of arms since the Middle Ages.

From the reign of Ottokar II of Bohemia, Moravia's coat of arms features a silver-red checquered eagle with a golden crown and claws, which looks to the right and is placed on a blue field.

The oldest surviving full-colour depiction of the coat of arms of Moravia is in a fresco in the hall of Gozzoburg Castle in Krems an der Donau, dating to the early 1270s. The checquered eagle is documented in a depiction from 1286 and later in the late 13th and early 14th century.

The colours of the chequered eagle were derived from the colours of the Bohemian lion (a silver lion on a red shield) and express the connection with the Bohemian king of Moravia and Bohemian monarchy, as, for example, historian Vladimír Růžek recalls. One of the first documented illustrations of the banner of Moravia is the view in the 1407 Gelnhausen Codex, which depicts the Moravian Margrave Jobst of Moravia with a blue banner on which the Moravian white and red eagle is placed with a yellow crown and yellow armor without a shield.

Modern age 

The heraldic flag of Moravia (the flag of Moravia in the form of the flag with coat of arms) is described and drawn for example in the work of Jacob Koebel: Wapen des heyligen römischen Reichs teutscher Nation from 1545.

Historically, there were several versions of the widely used and documented Moravian flags, which were mainly used during the 19th century in parallel to bicolours and tricolours derived from tinctures of provincial coat of arms. According to some authors, therefore, the Moravian flag consists of three horizontal strips of red, white, and blue. This color combination was the flag of the Moravian patriots in the 19th century. A delegation of the Moravians to the Slavonic Congress in Prague in 1848 allegedly marched under a tricolour with the top horizontal stripe white, the middle red and the bottom blue. White, red and blue colors are referred to as Moravia in the Nový prostonárodní popis Čech, Moravy a Slezska from 1854 and in some textbooks from the 19th century. According to Ivan Štarha, the Moravian colours in 1915 were white, red and blue, and between the years 1915 and 1918 yellow, red and blue. The Czechoslovak Republic restored the white or silver color to the Moravian coat of arms, but the color is not defined in the provincial status flags / banners Act No. 252/1920. 

Today, a yellow-red bicolour is sometimes used as the flag of Moravia, especially by some Moravian parties, associations and other organizations. The yellow-red bicolour has been used along with other bicolours and tricolours since the second half of 19th century, according to certain authors (L. E. Havlík, M. Hlinomaz).
Hereinafter referred to as Morava: k státoprávnímu postavení země v průběhu věků. As stated by M. Hlinomaz:  
The historian Ivan Štarha argues that Moravia was never awarded the flag. 
To today's yellow-red bicolour is sometimes added the provincial coat of arms with a red-gold checquered eagle. 
The red-gold checquered eagle variant was introduced in 2007, and was recommended by some members and supporters of the Moravian National Community to avoid a possible misidentification with other flags, for example the flag of the capital city Prague, which also consists of yellow and red horizontal stripes. This option is criticized by some Bohemian (Czech) nationalist experts.

Both of these versions, however, have been criticized by certain experts approached by the media (specifically historian M. Řepa, vexillologist K. Müller, and heraldist Jiří Louda).

The appearance of the flag has been a subject of discussion for more than 100 years. One variant consists of two bars, a yellow bar in the upper half, and a red bar in the lower half.

See also
Flag of Bohemia
 Coat of arms of Silesia

References

External links
 

Moravia
Moravia
Flags displaying animals